Miškinis is a Lithuanian language family name. It may refer to:
Vytautas Miškinis (born 1954), Lithuanian music composer and professor
Albertas Miškinis (born 1938), Lithuanian politician
Janina Sankutė-Miškinienė, a Lithuanian Righteous Among the Nations

 
Lithuanian-language surnames